Colmez is a French surname. It may refer to:
 Pierre Colmez, French mathematician
 Coralie Colmez, French mathematician and author (daughter of Pierre Colmez)

French-language surnames